Wyoming Highway 132 (WYO 132) is a  north–south Wyoming State Road in Fremont County that travels from U.S. Route 287 (US 287) near Lander, north to Kinnear by way of Ethete.

Route description
Wyoming Highway 132 begins its southern end north of Lander at US 287. Highway 132 proceeds northward toward Ethete. Before reaching Ethete, 17 Mile Road is intersected which turns into Wyoming Highway 137 east of here. Ethete is reached at approximately 7 miles into the route. WYO 132 heads north finally reaching its northern terminus at U.S. Route 26 and the southern end of Wyoming Highway 133 at 17.43 miles.
Highway 132 lies entirely within the Wind River Indian Reservation.

Major intersections

References

External links 

Wyoming State Routes 100-199
WYO 132 - US-287 to US-26/WYO 133

Transportation in Fremont County, Wyoming
132
Wind River Indian Reservation